Pratama may refer to:

 Pratama (surname)
 , a college in Purwokerto
 Excelcomindo Pratama, a mobile phone network operator in Indonesia
 , a state award in Indonesia